The Georgetown Historic District in Georgetown, Ohio is a  historic district that was listed on the National Register of Historic Places in 1978.  It includes 42 contributing buildings.

One contributing property in the district is the Brown County Courthouse.

References

National Register of Historic Places in Brown County, Ohio
Georgian architecture in Ohio
Greek Revival architecture in Ohio
Victorian architecture in Ohio
Historic districts on the National Register of Historic Places in Ohio